Must We Get Divorced? is a 1933 German comedy film directed by Hans Behrendt and starring Else Elster, Aribert Mog and Iván Petrovich. It was shot at the Emelka Studios of Bavaria Film in Munich. The film's sets were designed by the art director Max Knaake.

Cast
 Else Elster as Anni Lüders
 Aribert Mog as Gottfried Lüders
 Iván Petrovich as Edgar Radek
 S.Z. Sakall as Professor Friedrich Hornung
 Martha Ziegler as Irmgard
 Inez Allegri as Olly Rode
 Lotte Lang as Lissi Dorfmüller
 Liesl Karlstadt as Wirtschafterin bei Hornung
 Georg Henrich as Judge
 Kurt Horwitz as Anni's Lawyer
 Josef Eichheim as Gerichtsdiener Hubermann
 Herbert Langhofer as Lemke
 Beppo Brem as Edgar's Trainer
 O.E. Hasse as Ein Friseur
 Max Schreck as Kongresspräsident
 Richard Ryen as Gottfried's Lawyer

References

Bibliography 
 Klaus, Ulrich J. Deutsche Tonfilme: Jahrgang 1933. Klaus-Archiv, 1988.

External links 
 

1933 films
1933 comedy films
Films of the Weimar Republic
Films of Nazi Germany
German comedy films
1930s German-language films
Films directed by Hans Behrendt
German black-and-white films
1930s German films
Films shot at Bavaria Studios